WHNY may refer to:

 WHNY (AM), a radio station (1000 AM) licensed to serve Paris, Tennessee, United States
 WHNY-FM, a radio station (104.7 FM) licensed to serve Henry, Tennessee